Peter Dubé is a Canadian writer, who has published novels, short stories and essays. Originally from Montreal, he earned an MA from Concordia University's Creative Writing Program.

In addition to his own published work, Dubé has also edited several anthologies of gay male literature.

His 2020 poetry collection The Headless Man was shortlisted for the ReLit Award for poetry in 2021.

Works 
Hovering World 
At the Bottom of the Sky 
Subtle Bodies: A Fantasia on Voice, History and Rene Crevel 
The City's Gates  
Madder Love: Queer Men and the Precincts of Surrealism (editor) 
Best Gay Stories 2011 (editor) 
Best Gay Stories 2012 (editor)

References 

Concordia University alumni
Living people
Canadian gay writers
Canadian male short story writers
Writers from Montreal
Canadian male novelists
Canadian male poets
Canadian LGBT novelists
Canadian LGBT poets
Canadian male essayists
21st-century Canadian short story writers
21st-century Canadian essayists
21st-century Canadian poets
21st-century Canadian male writers
Year of birth missing (living people)
Gay poets
Gay novelists
21st-century Canadian LGBT people